The Soviet Women's Basketball Championship was the top women's basketball competition in the Soviet Union.

The championship was founded in 1937, and dominated by Dynamo Moscow in its early stages. Four years later it was interrupted due to World War Two. The competition was resumed in 1944, with MAI becoming a second powerhouse. In 1949 Dynamo Kyiv became the first non-Russian team to win the championship.

In 1959 Dynamo Moscow represented the Soviet Union in the inaugural edition of the European Cup. That same year the championship was won by Latvian team Daugava Riga, which soon established itself as the championship's major powerhouse, winning every edition of the tournament in the 1960s. Daugava's hegemony loosened somewhat in the 1970s, losing the 1974 and 1978 championships to Spartak Leningrad and Spartak Moscow, but still the Latvians, led by Uljana Semjonova, won every other edition until 1984.

In the second half of the 1980s Russian teams took again the lead, with CSKA Moscow and Dynamo Novosibirsk entering the competition's palmares. Following the collapse of the Soviet Union the championship was closed after the 1991 edition, which was won by Dynamo Kyiv. A CIS Championship was played in 1992 before each republic founded its own national league.

In addition to its hegemony in the championship Daugava Riga won a record 18 European Cups between 1960 and 1982, including 12 titles in a row. It was only in 1972 when other Soviet teams had the chance to triumph in Europe with the foundation of the Ronchetti Cup. Spartak Leningrad, Spartak Moscow, CSKA Moscow, Dynamo Novosibirsk, Daugava Riga and Dynamo Kyiv won 12 editions of the tournament.

History

Title holders

 1922–23 Petrograd Selective Team
 1923–24 Moscow Selective Team
 1924–27 Not held
 1927–28 Leningrad Selective Team
 1928–33 Not held
 1933–34 Moscow Selective Team
 1934–35 Leningrad Selective Team
 1935–36 Moscow Selective Team
 1936–37 Dynamo Moscow
 1937–38 Dynamo Moscow
 1938–39 Dynamo Moscow
 1939–40 Dynamo Moscow
 1940–43 Not held due to World War II
 1943–44 Dynamo Moscow
 1944–45 Dynamo Moscow
 1945–46 MAI

 1946–47 MAI
 1947–48 Dynamo Moscow
 1948–49 Dynamo Kyiv
 1949–50 Dynamo Moscow
 1950–51 MAI
 1951–52 Stroitel Moscow
 1952–53 Dynamo Moscow
 1953–54 MAI
 1954–55 MAI
 1955–56 Moscow Selective Team
 1956–57 Dynamo Moscow
 1957–58 Dynamo Moscow
 1958–59 Moscow Selective Team
 1959–60 Daugava Riga
 1960–61 Daugava Riga
 1961–62 Daugava Riga

 1962–63 Latvian SSR Team
 1963–64 Daugava Riga
 1964–65 Daugava Riga
 1965–66 Daugava Riga
 1966–67 Latvian SSR Team
 1967–68 Daugava Riga
 1968–69 Daugava Riga
 1969–70 Daugava Riga
 1970–71 Daugava Riga
 1971–72 Daugava Riga
 1972–73 Daugava Riga
 1973–74 Spartak Leningrad
 1974–75 Daugava Riga
 1975–76 Daugava Riga
 1976–77 Daugava Riga
 1977–78 Spartak Moscow

 1978–79 Daugava Riga
 1979–80 Daugava Riga
 1980–81 Daugava Riga
 1981–82 Daugava Riga
 1982–83 Daugava Riga
 1983–84 Daugava Riga
 1984–85 CSKA Moscow
 1985–86 Dynamo Novosibirsk
 1986–87 Dynamo Novosibirsk
 1987–88 Dynamo Novosibirsk
 1988–89 CSKA Moscow
 1989–90 Elektrosila Leningrad
 1990–91 Dynamo Kyiv
 1991–92 Dynamo Kyiv

References

Soviet Union
Basketball leagues in the Soviet Union
Sports leagues established in 1937
Basketball